747 is a piece of performance art by Chris Burden. Burden was photographed firing shots with a pistol at a Boeing 747 passenger airplane while it took off from Los Angeles International Airport at about 8am on January 5, 1973. The piece had a single witness, photographer Terry McDonnell, who filmed the act. Several years later, Burden was interviewed by the Federal Bureau of Investigation (FBI) after a photograph of the piece was published in a magazine. A calling card was left by the FBI at his studio and a meeting took place at his lawyer's house. Burden's lawyer explained the nature of Burden's work in performance art to the FBI agent.

Burden said of the act that "the plane wasn't in any danger. I went down to the beach and fired a few shots at a plane flying over head. I wasn't trying to shoot the plane down, it was more a gestural thing, trying to get it photographed — to make an image". Burden said in a 1980 interview with David Robbins that he told the FBI that the piece was "about the goodness of man — the idea that you can't regulate everybody. At the airport everybody’s being searched for guns, and here I am on the beach and it looks like I'm plucking planes out of the sky. You can’t regulate the world".

The piece is one of a number of photographs of Burden's work that in the collection of the Metropolitan Museum of Art in New York City.

Critic Dominic Johnson in his 2018 book Unlimited action: The performance of extremity in the 1970s wrote of the piece that "threat of criminal damage, mass death and personal ignominy ground the formal challenge that confirms the action as a performance... Uncertainty, notoriety and doubt form part of a work's existential charm".

747 was analysed by Daniel Cottom in his 2002 essay on Burden's art "To Love to Hate". Cottom identifies the piece as belonging to the Western European artistic tradition of 'misanthropy' feeling that Burden "committed an artwork of terrific suggestiveness" when he fired the gun at the airplane.

References

1970s photographs
1973 works
Black-and-white photographs
Boeing 747
Los Angeles International Airport
Performance art in Los Angeles
Works by Chris Burden